Barun Rai and The House on the Cliff is a paranormal, psychological horror thriller film directed by Sam Bhattacharjee and produced by Sam Bhattacharjee, Mitra Bhattacharya and Firuzi Khan. It stars Priyanshu Chatterjee, Nyra Banerjee, Sid Makkar, David Bailie, Tony Richardson and Ayvianna Snow. The film was produced by Unicorn Motion Pictures and is releasing under the banner of Big Films Media. The film was released on 29 October 2021, in the United Kingdom.

Plot 
The film is set in the 1970s and shot in Little Tawney Hall, Romford and Cornwall, England. The film revolves around a parapsychologist detective named Barun Rai, who can see what the normal eye cannot, using his powers to investigate crimes of a paranormal nature. It portrays the story of newlyweds Harmesh and Soumili, who move into their dream house, unaware of the spate of mysterious suicides disturbing the area and local police.

Cast 
 Priyanshu Chatterjee as Barun Rai
 Nyra Banerjee as Soumili
 Sid Makkar as Harmesh
 George Dawson as Brian
 Tony Richardson as Father Paul
 Aakash Shukal as Sukhbir
 Ayvianna Snow as Polly
 Adam Day as Reporter
 Mirabel Stuart as Camilla
 Emma Galliano as Inspector Jenny Jones
 David Bailie as Mentor

Production 
The film's shooting took place at locations in the United Kingdom such as Southampton, Camden, Cheshunt, North Weald, Stapleford Tawney, and Hackney, London.

Release 
The film was released on 29 October 2021, in the United Kingdom and scheduled to be released in December 2021 in India.

References

External links 
 Official website
 
 Barun Rai and The House on the Cliff at Rotten Tomatoes

2021 films
English-language Indian films
Films shot in the United Kingdom
2020s English-language films